Dave Thompson (born 30 June 1959) is an English actor, stand-up comedian and writer, who made headlines in July 1997 after being removed from the role of Tinky Winky in the children's television series, Teletubbies after 70 episodes. The BBC said in a letter to Thompson that his "interpretation of the role was not acceptable". 

Thompson recounted bursting into tears upon learning the news of his termination. In interviews, he supposed that the dubbing of his voice, unlike the other actors, was an indication of dissatisfaction over his performance.

Thompson later appeared in the 2000 Ben Elton film Maybe Baby as Dave the Comedian/Mrs. Furblob. He also appeared in Harry Hill's live tour Hooves as the minor characters of the Horse, the ballboy and the Greek man who grabs Harry's neck. Thompson also made appearances in each night of Hill's Hooves tour.

Filmography

Film 
Hardcore (1979) - Willem
Area (1989) - Doctor
Huge (2010) - Martin Luckhust
The Harry Hill Movie (2013) - Brain Number Two
Down the Back of the Sofa (2017) - Himself/host

Television 
Red Dwarf (1993) - Cowpoke
Teletubbies (1997; Season 1, 70 episodes) - Tinky Winky
Harry Hill (1998) - Fake Alan
Screech Owls (2002) - Himself
Time Gentleman Please (2000–2002) - Dave
TV Burp (2004–2012) - Various characters
Blessed (2005)

Production credits

Writer
The Sketch Show (8 episodes)
TV Burp (2 episodes)

Books
Sit-Down Comedy (contributor to anthology, ed Malcolm Hardee & John Fleming) Ebury Press/Random House, 2003. ;

References

External links

1959 births
Male actors from Bristol
Living people
British puppeteers
British stand-up comedians
British male television actors
British male film actors
British male comedians